Shaoyang railway station is a railway station, located in the Daxiang District, Shaoyang, Hunan, People's Republic of China.

Shaoyang is also served by Shaoyang North railway station, though it is much further away from the urban area.

History
In 2018, additional platforms were added. In 2020, a further expansion project was launched.

References

External links
 

Railway stations in Hunan